Andrei Emelin (Russian: Андрей Емелин, born August 4, 1967) of Russia serves as the Chief Executive of Russian Association of Scouts/Navigators, Chairman of the Central Executive Committee of the All-Russian Scout Association and an elected volunteer member of the Eurasia Regional Scout Committee of the World Organization of the Scout Movement (WOSM).

Emelin studied at Moscow State Pedagogical University, worked for :ru:Учительская газета and lives in Moscow.

References

External links
https://web.archive.org/web/20161112155947/http://networkrussia.org.uk/index.php/galleries/22-andrey-emelin-s-visit-in-2012
https://www.youtube.com/watch?v=QaEyCJYIPJA Обращение председателя ЦИК ВСА Андрея Емелина
https://www.youtube.com/watch?v=Ei-t9zi_0MY Машина голдберга

Scouting in Russia
Living people
1967 births
Eurasia Scout Committee members